The Seven Arts Building, is a one-and-one-half-story, commercial building in downtown Carmel-by-the-Sea, California. It was built in 1925, for poet mayor  Herbert Heron. The building was designated as a significant commercial building in the city's Downtown Historic District Property Survey, and was recorded with the Department of Parks and Recreation on January 31, 2003. The building has been occupied by the Carmel Bay Company since 1972.

History

In 1918, writer  Herbert Heron opened the first Seven Arts bookstore, selling books, art materials, poetry, and antiques near the Forest Theater, which he founded in 1910. Heron chose the name "Seven Arts," because it included the seven words: music, dancing, literature, painting, sculpture, and architecture.

In 1923, Heron commissioned Michael J. Murphy to build the Seven Arts Shop for he and Helena Conger at a new located on Ocean Avenue and Monte Verde Street, next to Edward G. Kuster's Carmel Weavers Studio.

In September 1925, The Seven Arts store moved again to a larger Seven Arts Building on Ocean Avenue and Lincoln Street. He hired architect Albert B. Coats and builder Percy Parkes to build the Tudor Revival style, building that included plans for an art gallery and frame shop. George & Catherine Seideneck did the original interior decoration. The building is a one-and-one-half-story, cement-block framed Tudor Revival style commercial building. The exterior wall is textured cement stucco. It has a steep pitched cross-gabled roof, and three brick chimneys. An open wood staircase, leads up to an open balcony, supported by wood posts and a rail, which has access to shops on the upper floor. 

The Seven Arts was home to Heron's bookshop and printing press, the Seven Arts Press, and the Carmelite newspapers. They published modernist articles about art, music, and culture. The Seven Arts Building became a popular meeting place for the many Bohemian artists and writers in Carmel including George Sterling, Mary Austin, and Jack London.

The Seven Arts Building accommodated several art organizations, including the Carmel Art Association, operated by Armin Hansen and Paul Whitman in the late 1930s. It became the first showplace for the Art Association in 1927 and the studio of photographer Edward Weston. The Carmel Cymbal weekly (later merged with the Carmel Pine Cone), was housed in the building.

The building qualifies for inclusion in the Downtown Historic District Property Survey because it is one of the early commercial buildings built for writer Herbert Heron; for the method of construction using a light grey interlocking Thermotite brick blocks that were manufactured by the Carmel Thermotite Company; and for the only known design by Monterey builder Albert B. Coats.

Heron built a two-story building just south of the Seven Arts Building on Lincoln Street. It has shops and offices around a brick courtyard, that he rented to artists, writers, and builders.

Albert B. Coats
Albert Blake Coats (1881-1949) arrived in the Monterey Peninsula around 1919. He was the chief builder and designer for the Monterey contractor James C. Anthony in the early 1920s. Coats was responsible for the design of Anthony's Monterey Mesa Tract artist's colony in 1923. In 1924, he worked for builder Fred McCreay as a designer and office manager. He established his own practice in 1929, working with his son Orville Coats. He used a specialized cement block framing system on the Seven Arts Building in Carmel. The product was called “Thermotite,” which was produced in Carmel in the mid 1920s. The material was advertised as "fireproof, waterproof and practically everlasting."

See also
 Monterey Peninsula

References

External links

 Downtown Conservation District Historic Property Survey
 Office of Historic Preservation
 Mr. Bunt, published by Seven Arts Press

1925 establishments in California
Carmel-by-the-Sea, California
Buildings and structures in Monterey County, California